In multivariable calculus, an initial value problem (IVP) is an ordinary differential equation together with an initial condition which specifies the value of the unknown function at a given point in the domain. Modeling a system in physics or other sciences frequently amounts to solving an initial value problem. In that context, the differential initial value is an equation which specifies how the system evolves with time given the initial conditions of the problem.

Definition 
An initial value problem is a differential equation
together with a point in the domain of 

called the initial condition.

A solution to an initial value problem is a function  that is a solution to the differential equation and satisfies

More generally, the unknown function  can take values on infinite dimensional spaces, such as Banach spaces or spaces of distributions.

Initial value problems are extended to higher orders by treating the derivatives in the same way as an independent function, e.g. .

Existence and uniqueness of solutions 

The Picard–Lindelöf theorem guarantees a unique solution on some interval containing t0 if f is continuous on a region containing t0 and y0 and satisfies the Lipschitz condition on the variable y.
The proof of this theorem proceeds by reformulating the problem as an equivalent integral equation. The integral can be considered an operator which maps one function into another, such that the solution is a fixed point of the operator. The Banach fixed point theorem is then invoked to show that there exists a unique fixed point, which is the solution of the initial value problem.

An older proof of the Picard–Lindelöf theorem constructs a sequence of functions which converge to the solution of the integral equation, and thus, the solution of the initial value problem. Such a construction is sometimes called "Picard's method" or "the method of successive approximations". This version is essentially a special case of the Banach fixed point theorem.

Hiroshi Okamura obtained a necessary and sufficient condition for the solution of an initial value problem to be unique.  This condition has to do with the existence of a Lyapunov function for the system.

In some situations, the function f is not of class C1, or even Lipschitz, so the usual result guaranteeing the local existence of a unique solution does not apply. The Peano existence theorem however proves that even for f merely continuous, solutions are guaranteed to exist locally in time; the problem is that there is no guarantee of uniqueness. The result may be found in Coddington & Levinson (1955, Theorem 1.3) or Robinson (2001, Theorem 2.6). An even more general result is the Carathéodory existence theorem, which proves existence for some discontinuous functions f.

Examples
We are trying to find a formula for  that satisfies these two equations.

Rearrange the equation so that  is on the left hand side

 

 
 

Eliminate the logarithm with exponentiation on both sides

 

Let  be a new unknown constant, so

 

 
 

Second example
The solution of

 

can be found to be

 

Indeed,

Notes

See also
 Boundary value problem
 Constant of integration
 Integral curve

References 

 
 
 
 
 
 

Boundary conditions

el:Αρχική τιμή
it:Problema ai valori iniziali
sv:Begynnelsevärdesproblem